Smith Street may refer to:

 Smith Street, Darwin, Australia
 Smith Street, Melbourne, Australia
 Smith Street Motorway, Gold Coast, Queensland, Australia
 Smith Street, Singapore
 Smith Street, a main shopping street in South Brooklyn, United States
 "Smith Street", a 2022 song by Birds of Tokyo

See also
 SmithStreetSolutions, a Shanghai-based consulting firm
 The Smith Street Band, an Australian rock named after the Melbourne street